Karl may refer to:

People
 Karl (given name), including a list of people and characters with the name
 Karl der Große, commonly known in English as Charlemagne
 Karl Marx, German philosopher and political writer
 Karl of Austria, last Austrian Emperor
 Karl (footballer) (born 1993), Karl Cachoeira Della Vedova Júnior, Brazilian footballer

In myth
 Karl (mythology), in Norse mythology, a son of Rig and considered the progenitor of peasants (churl)
 Karl, giant in Icelandic myth, associated with Drangey island

Vehicles
 Opel Karl, a car
 ST Karl, Swedish tugboat requisitioned during the Second World War as ST Empire Henchman

Other uses 
 Karl, Germany, municipality in Rhineland-Palatinate, Germany
 Karl-Gerät, AKA Mörser Karl, 600mm German mortar used in the Second World War
 KARL project, an open source knowledge management system
 Korean Amateur Radio League, a national non-profit organization for amateur radio enthusiasts in South Korea
 KARL, a radio station in Minnesota
 List of storms named Karl, a number of named tropical cyclones

See also

 Carl (disambiguation)
 Carle, a name
 Karle (disambiguation)
 Carll S. Burr, Jr. (1858–1936), New York politician
 Carol (disambiguation)
 Churl (also churl, ceorl, carl), freeman peasant in the Scandinavian caste system
 John L. Karle (1894–1953), New York politician
 Karl-Heinz
Karlo (name)